is a district of Shibuya, Tokyo, Japan.

As of October 2020, the population of this district is 3,218. The postal code for Ōyamachō is 151-0065.

Tokyo Camii, the largest mosque in Japan, is located here.

Education
 operates public elementary and junior high schools.

Oyamacho 1-8 and 12-47 is zoned to Nishihara Elementary School (西原小学校) and Yoyogi Junior High School (代々木中学校). Oyamacho 9-11 is zoned to Uehara Elementary School (上原小学校) and Uehara Junior High School (上原中学校).

References

Neighborhoods of Tokyo
Districts of Shibuya